Marvin Lier (born 8 September 1992) is a Swiss handball player for Pfadi Winterthur and the Swiss national team.

He represented Switzerland at the 2020 European Men's Handball Championship.

References

External links

1992 births
Living people
Swiss male handball players
Sportspeople from Zürich
Expatriate handball players
Swiss expatriate sportspeople in Germany
SG Flensburg-Handewitt players
Handball-Bundesliga players
Universiade medalists in handball
Universiade bronze medalists for Switzerland
Medalists at the 2015 Summer Universiade